Rhesus Glacier is a 7 km long and 2.5 km wide glacier draining the east slopes of the Trojan Range on Anvers Island in the Palmer Archipelago, Antarctica southeast of Paris Peak. Situated east of Iliad Glacier, south of Lipen Glacier and north of Thamyris Glacier.  Flowing northeastwards into Fournier Bay south of Thompson Peninsula and north of Predel Point.

The glacier is named after the King Rhesus of Thrace in Homer's Iliad.

Location
British mapping in 1980.

See also
 List of glaciers in the Antarctic
 Glaciology

Maps
 British Antarctic Territory. Scale 1:200000 topographic map No. 3217. DOS 610 - W 64 62. Tolworth, UK, 1980.
 Antarctic Digital Database (ADD). Scale 1:250000 topographic map of Antarctica. Scientific Committee on Antarctic Research (SCAR). Since 1993, regularly upgraded and updated.

References
 Rhesus Glacier. SCAR Composite Gazetteer of Antarctica.
 Bulgarian Antarctic Gazetteer. Antarctic Place-names Commission. (details in Bulgarian, basic data in English)

External links
 Rhesus Glacier. Copernix satellite image

Glaciers of the Palmer Archipelago
Bulgaria and the Antarctic
Geography of Anvers Island